Petrotyx is a genus of reef-dwelling cusk-eels.

Species
There are currently two recognized species in this genus:
 Petrotyx hopkinsi Heller & Snodgrass, 1903 (Velvetnose brotula)
 Petrotyx sanguineus (Meek & Hildebrand, 1928) (Redfin brotula)

References

Ophidiidae
Taxa named by Robert Evans Snodgrass